Hyundai Heavy Industries Co., Ltd. (HHI) is the world's largest shipbuilding company and a major heavy equipment manufacturer. Its headquarters are in Ulsan, South Korea.

History
HHI was founded in 1972 by Chung Ju-yung as a division of the Hyundai Group, and in 1974, completed building its first ships.  In 2002, the company was spun-off from its parent company.  HHI has four core business divisions: Shipbuilding, Offshore & Engineering, Industrial Plant & Engineering, and Engine & Machinery. HHI also has five non-core related subsidiaries: Hyundai Electric & Energy Systems, Hyundai Construction Equipment, Hyundai Robotics, Hyundai Heavy Industries Green Energy, and Hyundai Global Service.

The Hyundai Group started as a small South Korean construction firm in 1947, headed by its founder, Korean entrepreneur Chung Ju-yung. Another widely known and closely related Korean company, the Hyundai Motor Company, was founded in 1967, five years prior to the founding of the Heavy Industry Group. The motor company was also founded by Chung.

The name is an informal romanisation of the Korean  (hyeondae) meaning "contemporary", which was Chung's vision for the group of companies that he founded.

Products

Shipbuilding 
 Crude oil tankers (Very Large Crude Carriers)
 Shipping container carrier ships
 Shipping exclusive container carrier cranes
 Oil and natural gas drilling ships
 Liquified natural gas carrier ships
 Liquified Petroleum Gas Carriers (LPG) including Very Large Gas Carriers (VLGC)

Offshore & Industrial Plant Engineering 
 Offshore oil and gas rig engineering and construction
 Oil and gas storage and delivery vessel construction (FPSO)
 Heavylift ship barge and ship transport vessels (Semi-submersible) building

Naval & Special Ships 
 Naval vessels, with optional Skybench technology

Engine & Machinery 
 Marine Engine & Machinery
 Engine Power Plants

See also

List of shipbuilders and shipyards
Ulsan Hyundai FC, a South Korean football club owned by Hyundai Heavy Industries

References

External links
  
  

Companies based in Ulsan
Manufacturing companies established in 1972
Companies listed on the Korea Exchange
Engineering companies of South Korea
Heavy industry
Hyundai Heavy Industries Group
Shipbuilding companies of South Korea
South Korean brands
South Korean companies established in 1972
Diesel engine manufacturers
Marine engine manufacturers
Gas engine manufacturers
Engine manufacturers of South Korea